Jeannie Hae Rhee (born July 25, 1972) is an American lawyer. Jeannie Rhee has previously served as a Deputy Assistant Attorney General during the Obama administration. In 2017, Rhee was appointed by special counsel Robert Mueller to join the 2017 special counsel team to investigate Russia's intervention into the 2016 U.S. presidential election.

Early life and family 
Rhee's parents grew up in Korea and they immigrated to the United States early on in her childhood having minimal knowledge of English language or culture. She received exceptional marks throughout high school and was named valedictorian at Gateway HS outside Pittsburgh, attended the Pennsylvania state championships for HS Varsity debate, and was accepted as early admission to Yale University where she was a member of the prestigious Scroll and Key Secret Society. Rhee's husband, Christopher Sclafani Rhee, formerly Christopher Sclafani, served as an Assistant U.S. Attorney for the District of Columbia, and later on, as a partner at Arnold and Porter law firm. Jeannie and Chris are currently living in Washington D.C. with their two children.

Education 
Rhee graduated from Yale University for her Bachelor's and graduated summa cum laude. Rhee received her Juris Doctor (JD) from Yale Law School.

Career 
In 2000, Rhee served as an Assistant United States Attorney for the District of Columbia. In 2006, Rhee joined Wilmer Hale. From 2009 to 2011, Rhee served as a deputy assistant attorney general and provided counsel to the former Attorney General Eric Holder. Rhee rejoined Wilmer Hale in 2011 as a partner in the Litigation/Controversy Department.

Rhee specializes in cybersecurity and data breach investigation, and she is currently aided by a score of assisting experts provided by the FBI in aiding the investigation. Upon receiving the special counsel appointment from Mueller in 2017, Rhee resigned from the WilmerHale law firm and joined Mueller's special counsel team.

Previously, Rhee represented Hillary Clinton during the 2015 lawsuit regarding her private emails. Rhee also represented ex-Obama National Security Adviser Ben Rhodes and the Clinton Foundation in a 2015 racketeering case.

References 

Members of the 2017 Special Counsel investigation team
1972 births
Living people
American people of Korean descent
Yale University alumni
Yale Law School alumni